Papua New Guinea were first granted T20I status in January 2014, simultaneously being granted One Day International (ODI) status. This was a result of their performance at the 2014 World Cup Qualifier, where they placed fourth to narrowly miss out on qualifying for the 2015 World Cup. The team made its ODI debut in November 2014, against Hong Kong, but did not play a full Twenty20 International until July 2015, during the 2015 World Twenty20 Qualifier. Papua New Guinea's debut in the format was originally intended to come in its second match of the tournament, against Hong Kong, but the match was rained out. Instead, the team's first Twenty20 International came against Ireland, with PNG winning by two wickets. In April 2018, the ICC decided to grant full Twenty20 International (T20I) status to all its members. Therefore, all Twenty20 matches played between Papua New Guinea and other ICC members after 1 January 2019 will be a full T20I.

This list comprises all members of the Papua New Guinea cricket team who have played at least one T20I match. It is initially arranged in the order in which each player won his first Twenty20 cap. Where more than one player won his first Twenty20 cap in the same match, those players are listed alphabetically by surname.

Key

List of players
Statistics are correct as of 17 July 2022.

Note: The following matches include one or more missing catchers in their Cricinfo scorecard and hence statistics (as of 19 July 2019):
 vs. Samoa (10 July 2019); 4 missing catchers
 vs. Vanuatu (12 July 2019); 2 missing catchers
 vs. Vanuatu (13 July 2019); 1 missing catcher

See also
 Papua New Guinea ODI cricketers

References 

Papua

Twenty20